The 2014 British Rowing Senior Championships were the 43rd edition of the National Senior Championships, held from 18–19 October 2014 at the National Water Sports Centre in Holme Pierrepont, Nottingham. They were organised and sanctioned by British Rowing, and are open to British rowers. Bad weather in the forms of gusts of wind resulted in the medals (for the quadruple sculls and coxed eights) being awarded based on the crews positions during qualifying races.

Medal summary

References

British Rowing Senior Championships
British Rowing Senior Championships
British Rowing Senior Championships